Aldo Bentini (born 23 November 1948) is a retired Italian boxer. He competed at the 1968 Olympics but was eliminated in the second round. After that he turned professional, and won a national super welterweight title in 1973. He lost it in 1974, and after a few unsuccessful attempts to regain it retired in 1977.

References

1948 births
Living people
Sportspeople from the Province of Latina
Italian male boxers
Boxers at the 1968 Summer Olympics
Olympic boxers of Italy
Lightweight boxers
20th-century Italian people
People from Cisterna di Latina